Charles H. Spencer House, formerly Christian Science Society and First Church of Christ, Scientist, Grinnell, located in Grinnell, Iowa, in the United States, is an historic Carpenter Gothic house which was converted into a church. On January 25, 1980, it was added to the National Register of Historic Places.

History
The Charles H. Spencer House was built at the corner of 6th Avenue and Main Street in the late 1860s as a private residence. Charles H. Spencer was the founder of the First National Bank of Grinnell.  There was one intermediate move before the building was moved to its present location. It is no longer used as a church and now houses a gift shop.

See also
 List of Registered Historic Places in Iowa
 First Church of Christ, Scientist (disambiguation)

References

External links
 Christian Science churches in Iowa
 Beginner's Field Guide to Grinnell and its Environs

Churches on the National Register of Historic Places in Iowa
Houses on the National Register of Historic Places in Iowa
Former Christian Science churches, societies and buildings in Iowa
Houses in Poweshiek County, Iowa
Carpenter Gothic church buildings in Iowa
Carpenter Gothic houses in the United States
National Register of Historic Places in Poweshiek County, Iowa
Grinnell, Iowa